Niccola Francesco Ippolito Baldassarre Rosellini, known simply as Ippolito Rosellini (13 August 1800 – 4 June 1843) was an Italian Egyptologist. A scholar and friend of Jean-François Champollion, he is regarded as the founder of Egyptology in Italy.

Biography
He was born in Pisa, eldest son of a family originally from Pescia. After studying Hebrew and graduating in theology at the University of Pisa in 1821, Rosellini studied oriental languages under Giuseppe Mezzofanti at Bologna until 1824, when he became professor of the same subject at the University of Pisa.

He was the first disciple, a great friend and an associate of Jean-François Champollion. They met in Florence in August 1825, during Champollion's journey to study the important Egyptological collections in Turin, Rome and Florence. In 1827, he went to Paris for a year in order to improve his knowledge of the method of decipherment proposed by Champollion. Here, he met and then married Zenobia, daughter of the Italian composer Luigi Cherubini. A year later, Rosellini accompanied Champollion in the latter's Egyptian exploration also known as the Franco-Tuscan expedition, as the leader of the Tuscan group (1828–29). The expedition was financed by the Grand-duke of Tuscany, Leopold II, and King Charles X of France.

Champollion's sudden death in 1832 left to the saddened Rosellini the whole responsibility of publishing the report of the expedition: between 1832 and 1843 he exposed the results in his most famous work, I Monumenti dell'Egitto e della Nubia, composed of three parts and nine volumes for a total of 3,300 text pages and 395 illustrated plates.

Since 1836, Rosellini's health started to decline possibly due to malaria, which ultimately led to his death on 4 June 1843 in Pisa. All his papers were donated to the library of the University of Pisa, while the last volume of the Monumenti was published posthumously in 1844. Three years after his death, his widow married his brother Ferdinando Pio, a mathematician, who adopted their three sons.

Selected works
 1826. Di un bassorilievo egiziano della imp. e r. Galleria di Firenze
 1830. Breve notizia degli oggetti di antichità egiziane riportate dalla Spedizione letteraria toscana in Egitto e nella Nubia, eseguita negli anni 1828-29 ed esposti al pubblico nell'Accademia delle arti e mestieri in S. Caterina  
 1832-44. I Monumenti dell'Egitto e della Nubia, disegnati dalla spedizione scientifico-letteraria Toscana in Egitto: distribuiti in ordine di materie, interpretati ed illustrati
1832. Parte I. Monumenti storici, tomo I
1833. Parte I. Monumenti storici, tomo II
1834. Parte II. Monumenti civili, tomo I
1834. Parte II. Monumenti civili, tomo II
1836. Parte II. Monumenti civili, tomo III
1838. Parte I. Monumenti storici, tomo III, parte I
1839. Parte I. Monumenti storici, tomo III, parte II
1839. Parte I. Monumenti storici, tomo IV
1841. Parte I. Monumenti storici, tomo V
1844 (posthumous). Parte III. Monumenti di culto, tomo unico
 1837. Elementa Linguae Aegyptiacae, vulgo Copticae (ed. by L.M. Ungarelli).

References

Bibliography

Attribution

External links
 

1800 births
1843 deaths
People from Pisa
Deaths from malaria
Italian Egyptologists
19th-century Italian writers
19th-century male writers
Writers from Tuscany
19th-century archaeologists
University of Pisa alumni
Academic staff of the University of Pisa
Italian librarians